"Love's Not Enough" is a song by New Zealand band Dragon, released in April 1979 as a non-album single, but later to appear on the compilation album Snake Eyes on the Paradise Greatest Hits 1976–1989. The single charted at number 37 on the Australian Kent Music Report. It was the group's first release without Marc Hunter; he had been replaced by Billy Rogers and Richard Lee. Lee had played on a previous Dragon single, "Are you Old Enough". "Love's Not Enough" had been popular in Dragon's live repertoire prior to Hunter's departure. The b-side of the single, "Four Short Solos" was contrived to give drummer Kerry Jacobson and new members Rogers and Lee some songwriting royalties on a release that the group expected would be a major hit.

Track listing 
 Love's Not Enough (Paul Hewson) - 3:36
 Four Short Solos (Kerry Jacobson, Richard Lee, Billy Rogers) - 3:22

Charts

Personnel 
 Bass, vocals – Todd Hunter
 Drums – Kerry Jacobson
 Guitar, vocals – Robert Taylor
 Keyboards, vocals – Paul Hewson
 Saxophone, lead vocals – Billy Rogers
 Synthesizer – Murray Burns
 Electric violin – Richard Lee

References 

Dragon (band) songs
CBS Records singles
1979 singles
1979 songs
Song recordings produced by Peter Dawkins (musician)